Almaden is a rural town and locality in the Shire of Mareeba, Queensland, Australia.

Geography 

Almaden is on the Mareeba-to-Chillagoe railway line (part of the Tablelands railway line) which runs between Mareeba and the mining and cattle town of Mungana. Almaden railway station serves the town. The Etheridge railway line branches off at Almdaden towards Forsayth, with Ootann railway station, in the south of the locality of Almaden.

The Burke Developmental Road passes through from east to north-west. Ootann Road exits to the south.

History 
The town is named after the town of Almadén in Cuidad Real Province, Spain, which is known for its mercury mine. The mineral deposits in Queensland's Almaden are tripolite (diatomite).

Tate Tin Mines Provisional School opened on 17 October 1894. On 1 January 1909 it became Tate Tin Mines State School. It closed on 31 Jan 1924 but reopened on 3 February 1930. It closed permanently on 31 December 1940.

Almaden Provisional School opened on 6 July 1906 on a  site. On 1 January 1909 it became Almaden State School. It closed on 12 December 1997. It was at 22 Almaden Second Street. It is now a tourist park.

Ootann Provisional School opened on 23 May 1929 and closed circa 1933.

In the  ,the locality of Almaden had a population of 71 people.

Education
There are no schools in Almaden. The nearest government primary school is Chillagoe State School in neighbouring Chillagoe to the north-west. The nearest secondary school is Dimbulah State School (to Year 10) in Dimbulah to the north-west. For secondary education to Year 12, the options are distance education and boarding schools.

Attractions
The town is an overnight stop for the Savannahlander which operates twice weekly between Cairns and Forsayth.

References

External links 

Towns in Queensland
Shire of Mareeba
Localities in Queensland